Edward Maurice Lisbona (16 July 1905 – 30 November 1989) was an English songwriter, who under the name of Eddie "Piano" Miller, was also a popular piano player and bandleader of the 1950s and 1960s.

Lisbona was born in Manchester, England. He died in Pinellas Park, Florida, United States.

Songwriter
"It's My Mother's Birthday Today", a hit for Arthur Tracy
"Bob's Your Uncle"
"Ticky-Ticky-Tee (Shoemaker's Serenade)"
"Symphony of Spring"
"Gently", recorded by Elvis Presley in 1961 (Something for Everybody)
"Prayer", written with Alfred Bryan, recorded by Eddy Arnold

References

1905 births
1989 deaths
English songwriters
English pianists
Big band bandleaders
Musicians from Manchester
20th-century British musicians
20th-century pianists
British expatriates in the United States